6000  (six thousand) is the natural number following 5999 and preceding 6001.

Selected numbers in the range 6001–6999

6001 to 6099
 6025 – Rhythm guitarist of the Dead Kennedys from June 1978 to March 1979. Full name is Carlos Cadona.
 6028 – centered heptagonal number
 6037 – super-prime, prime of the form 2p-1
 6047 – safe prime
 6053 – Sophie Germain prime
 6069 – nonagonal number
 6073 – balanced prime
 6079 – The serial number Winston Smith is referred to as in the George Orwell novel Nineteen Eighty-Four
 6084 = 782, sum of the cubes of the first twelve integers
 6089 – highly cototient number
 6095 – magic constant of n × n normal  magic square and n-Queens Problem for n = 23.

6100 to 6199
 6101 – Sophie Germain prime
 6105 – triangular number
 6113 – Sophie Germain prime, super-prime
 6121 – prime of the form 2p-1
 6131 – Sophie Germain prime, twin prime with 6133
 6133 – 800th prime number, twin prime with 6131
 6143 – Thabit number
 6144 – 3-smooth number (211×3)
 6173 – Sophie Germain prime
 6174 – Kaprekar's constant
 6181 – octahedral number

6200 to 6299
 6200 – harmonic divisor number
 6201 – square pyramidal number
 6211 – cuban prime of the form x = y + 1
 6216 – triangular number
 6217 – super-prime, prime of the form 2p-1
 6229 – super-prime
 6232 – amicable number with 6368
  – Most widely accepted figure for the number of verses in the Qur'an
 6241 = 792, centered octagonal number
 6250 – Leyland number
 6263 – Sophie Germain prime, balanced prime
 6269 – Sophie Germain prime
 6280 – decagonal number

6300 to 6399
 6311 – super-prime
 6317 – balanced prime
 6322 – centered heptagonal number
 6323 – Sophie Germain prime, balanced prime, super-prime
 6328 – triangular number
 6329 – Sophie Germain prime
  – Number of verses in the Qur'an according to the sect founded by Rashad Khalifa.
 6348 – pentagonal pyramidal number
 6361 – prime of the form 2p-1, twin prime
 6364 – nonagonal number
 6367 – balanced prime
 6368 – amicable number with 6232
 6373 – balanced prime, sum of three and seven consecutive primes (2113 + 2129 + 2131 and 883 + 887 + 907 + 911 + 919 + 929 + 937)
 6397 – sum of three consecutive primes (2129 + 2131 + 2137)
 6399 – smallest integer that cannot be expressed as a sum of fewer than 279 eighth powers

6400 to 6499
 6400 = 802
 6408 – sum of the squares of the first thirteen primes
 6441 – triangular number
 6449 – Sophie Germain prime
 6466 – Markov number
 6491 – Sophie Germain prime

6500 to 6599
 6502 – model number of the MOS Technology 6502 which equipped early computers such as the Apple I and II, Commodore PET, Atari and others.
 6509 – highly cototient number
 6521 – Sophie Germain prime
 6542 – number of primes .
 6545 – tetrahedral number
 6551 – Sophie Germain prime
 6555 – triangular number
 6556 – member of a Ruth-Aaron pair with 6557 (first definition)
 6557 – member of a Ruth-Aaron pair with 6556 (first definition)
 6561 = 812 = 94 = 38, perfect totient number, centered octagonal number
 6563 – Sophie Germain prime
 6581 – Sophie Germain prime
 6599 – safe prime

6600 to 6699
 6601 – Carmichael number, decagonal number
 6623 – centered heptagonal number
 6659 – safe prime
 6666 – nonagonal number; the number of demons in a legion of demons
 6670 – triangular number

6700 to 6799
 6719 – safe prime, highly cototient number
 6724 = 822
 6728 – number of domino tilings of a 6×6 checkerboard
 6761 – Sophie Germain prime
 6765 – 20th Fibonacci number
 6779 – safe prime
 6786 – triangular number

6800 to 6899
 6811 – member of a Ruth-Aaron pair with 6812 (first definition)
 6812 – member of a Ruth-Aaron pair with 6811 (first definition)
 6827 – safe prime
 6841 - largest right-truncatable prime in base 7
 6842 – number of parallelogram polyominoes with 12 cells
 6859 = 193
 6863 – balanced prime
 6879 – number of planar partitions of 15
 6880 – vampire number
 6889 = 832, centered octagonal number
 6899 – Sophie Germain prime, safe prime

6900 to 6999
 6903 – triangular number
 6912 – 3-smooth number (28×33)
 6924 – magic constant of n × n normal magic square and n-Queens Problem for n = 24.
 6929 – highly cototient number
 6930 – decagonal number, square pyramidal number
 6931 – centered heptagonal number
 6969 – 2015 comedic progressive rock song by the band Ninja Sex Party
 6975 – nonagonal number
 6977 – balanced prime
 6983 – Sophie Germain prime, safe prime
 6997 – 900th prime number

Prime numbers
There are 117 prime numbers between 6000 and 7000:
6007, 6011, 6029, 6037, 6043, 6047, 6053, 6067, 6073, 6079, 6089, 6091, 6101, 6113, 6121, 6131, 6133, 6143, 6151, 6163, 6173, 6197, 6199, 6203, 6211, 6217, 6221, 6229, 6247, 6257, 6263, 6269, 6271, 6277, 6287, 6299, 6301, 6311, 6317, 6323, 6329, 6337, 6343, 6353, 6359, 6361, 6367, 6373, 6379, 6389, 6397, 6421, 6427, 6449, 6451, 6469, 6473, 6481, 6491, 6521, 6529, 6547, 6551, 6553, 6563, 6569, 6571, 6577, 6581, 6599, 6607, 6619, 6637, 6653, 6659, 6661, 6673, 6679, 6689, 6691, 6701, 6703, 6709, 6719, 6733, 6737, 6761, 6763, 6779, 6781, 6791, 6793, 6803, 6823, 6827, 6829, 6833, 6841, 6857, 6863, 6869, 6871, 6883, 6899, 6907, 6911, 6917, 6947, 6949, 6959, 6961, 6967, 6971, 6977, 6983, 6991, 6997

See also
 Year 6000

References

Integers